Jaime de Zudáñez (25 July 1776, in Chuquisaca – 1832, in Montevideo) was a Bolivian politician and hero of the independence of three countries in South America.

Biography
Zudáñez was born in the city of La Plata, Chuquisaca, in present-day Bolivia. He graduated as a lawyer in 1792, and continued his studies at the Academia Carolina, where he obtained a graduate degree in 1795 and was appointed Public Defender of Indigents. He was central to the independence movement that started in Chuquisaca on May 25, 1809, when after being arrested on suspicions of conspiracy, he publicly cried for help while being conducted to jail. A mob responded by taking over the city and capturing the authorities.

The Colonial authorities, after the recapture of the city, sent him as a prisoner to Callao, in Peru. From there, three months later, and after being liberated, he travelled to Chile (1811), where he worked with Generales Bernardo O'Higgins and Juan Mackenna, and became a friend of José Miguel Carrera. He had to seek refuge in Buenos Aires (1814) after the Battle of Rancagua.

Zudáñez was a Vice President of the Tucumán Congress (1817–1819).  He lived in Montevideo, Uruguay (1820), where he was a deputy to Congress (1828–1830). He died soon after in 1832.

See also
Jaime Zudáñez Province

References

1776 births
1832 deaths
University of Charcas alumni
Bolivian politicians
People of the Spanish American wars of independence
People of the Chilean War of Independence
Foreign ministers of Chile
Chilean diplomats
Members of the Chamber of Representatives of Uruguay